Baober in Love, also known as Baobei in Love, is a 2004 Chinese romantic mystery thriller film directed by Li Shaohong, and starring Zhou Xun, Huang Jue, Liao Fan, Li Xiaoran and Chen Kun.

Plot
Liu Zhi, a young man living a depressed life from his marriage with a dominating girl, met Baober (an ageless young girl) on Beijing street one day. They fell in love and started to live a strange, mysterious life....
One day Baober (Zhou Xun) finds a videotape made by Liu Zhi (Huang Jue) who thinks he has lost life's meaning. She sets out to find him and save him through love.

Cast
 Zhou Xun as Baober
 Huang Jue as Liu Zi
 Liao Fan as  Li Yang
 Li Xiaoran 
 Chen Kun as Mao Mao
 Robert Lin

Awards and nominations

References

2004 films
2004 romantic drama films
Chinese romantic drama films
Mystery thriller films